The 2002 Copa AT&T was a men's tennis tournament played on outdoor clay courts at the Buenos Aires Lawn Tennis Club in Buenos Aires, Argentina and was part of the International Series of the 2002 ATP Tour. The tournament ran from February 18 through February 24, 2002. Unseeded Nicolás Massú won the singles title.

Finals

Singles

 Nicolás Massú defeated  Agustín Calleri 2–6, 7–6(7–5), 6–2
 It was Massú's only title of the year and the 1st of his career.

Doubles

 Gastón Etlis /  Martín Rodríguez defeated  Simon Aspelin /  Andrew Kratzmann 3–6, 6–3, [10–4]
 It was Etlis' 2nd title of the year and the 2nd of his career. It was Rodríguez's 2nd title of the year and the 2nd of his career.

References

External links
 Official website 
 ATP tournament profile

Copa ATandT
ATP Buenos Aires
Copa ATandT
February 2002 sports events in South America